Khalil Abdel Salam Bader (born 27 July 1999) is a Lebanese footballer who plays as a forward for  club Nejmeh and the Lebanon national team.

Club career 
Bader was loaned out to Chabab Ghazieh by Nejmeh for the 2018–19 Lebanese Premier League. He finished the season as his team's top scorer, with six goals and five assists.

In September 2019, Nejmeh renewed Bader's contract for an additional three years. In July 2020, Nejmeh officials confirmed that they had rejected an offer for Bader by Tunisian club ES Métlaoui.

International career 
In 2019, Bader was called up to play for the Lebanon national under-23 team. He made his senior debut for the Lebanon national team on 19 November 2022, as a substitute in a 2–0 friendly defeat to Kuwait in Dubai, United Arab Emirates.

Personal life 
Bader was noted as one of Lebanon's most promising talents in his youth.

Career statistics

International

Honours
Nejmeh
 Lebanese FA Cup: 2021–22
 Lebanese Elite Cup: 2017, 2021

References

External links

 
 
 

1999 births
Living people
People from Chouf District
Lebanese footballers
Association football forwards
Nejmeh SC players
Chabab Ghazieh SC players
Lebanese Premier League players
Lebanon youth international footballers
Lebanon international footballers